Spell Eater is the debut studio album by Highland Park, California heavy metal band Huntress. It was released on April 27, 2012. The album was produced, engineered and mixed at the Sunset Lodge Recording studio in Los Angeles, California.

Track listing

Music by Huntress.  Lyrics by Jill Janus.

Personnel
Huntress
Jill Janus – vocals
Blake Meahl – lead guitar
Ian Alden – rhythm guitar
Eric Harris - bass
Carl Wierzbicky – drums

Production
Chris Rakestraw - Production, engineering, and mixing
Vance Kelley - Artwork and layout

References

2012 debut albums
Huntress (band) albums
Napalm Records albums